Jan Firlej (born 26 September 1996) is a Polish professional volleyball player. At the professional club level, he plays for Projekt Warsaw.

He was called up to the Poland national team for the 2022 Nations League.

References

External links
 
 Player profile at PlusLiga.pl 
 Player profile at Volleybox.net

1996 births
Living people
People from Radom
Polish men's volleyball players
Polish expatriate sportspeople in Belgium
Expatriate volleyball players in Belgium
Czarni Radom players
Projekt Warsaw players
GKS Katowice (volleyball) players
AZS Olsztyn players
Setters (volleyball)